Helen Duncan (1897–1956) was a Scottish medium best known as the last person to be imprisoned under the British Witchcraft Act of 1735.

Helen Duncan may also refer to:
 Helen Duncan (politician) (1941–2007), member of the New Zealand House of Representatives
 Helen M. Duncan (1910–1971), United States geologist and paleontologist